Arma is a possible but unattested extinct language of Colombia. Loukotka (1968) claims that it was once spoken on the Pueblano River, but lists no source to substantiate this claim.

See also
Arma-Pozo language

References

Choco languages
Languages of Colombia
Unattested languages of South America
Extinct languages of South America